Robert Devenish may refer to:
Robert Devenish (herald) (c. 1637–1704), English herald: Norroy and Ulster King of Arms, 1700–1704
Robert Devenish (Dean of Cashel) (died 1916), Irish Anglican priest and father of the below
Robert Devenish (Archdeacon of Lahore) (1888–1973), Irish Anglican priest in England and the colonies